The LXXXVII Army Corps was an army corps of the German Wehrmacht during World War II. It was formed in 1942 and existed until March 1944. 

Between March 1944 and August 1944, the successive formation was known as Army Detachment von Zangen, and then, between August 1944 and the end of the war, as Army Group Liguria.

History

LXXXVII Army Corps, November 1942 – March 1944 
The LXXXVII Army Corps was formed on 5 November 1942 from General Command G, also known as General Command North Brittany. The initial commander of the LXXXVII Army Corps was Erich Marcks.

Marcks was replaced as corps commander by Gustav-Adolf von Zangen on 1 August 1943.

Army Detachment von Zangen, March 1944 – August 1944 
In March 1944, the LXXXVII Army Corps became Armeeabteilung von Zangen, a field army level formation named after corps commander Gustav-Adolf von Zangen.

In August 1944, the army detachment was then formed to become Armeegruppe Ligurien.

Structure

Noteworthy individuals 

 Erich Marcks, corps commander of the LXXXVII Army Corps (12 November 1942 – 1 August 1943).
 Gustav-Adolf von Zangen, corps commander of the LXXXVII Army Corps and Armeeabteilung von Zangen (1 August 1943 – August 1944).

References 

Corps of Germany in World War II
Military units and formations established in 1942
Military units and formations disestablished in 1945